Dolington Village Historic District is a national historic district located at Dolington, Upper Makefield Township and Lower Makefield Township, Bucks County, Pennsylvania.  The district includes 64 contributing buildings, 2 contributing sites, and 4 contributing structures in the crossroads village of Dolington. The largely rural residential district includes representative buildings of the vernacular Federal and Gothic styles. The buildings were mostly built between 1800 and 1875.  Notable buildings include the John L. Cox House (c. 1887), Joseph Moon House, Balderson House, John Harris House (1803), William Thornton House (c. 1803), John B. Alcutt House (c. 1845), Dolington Schoolhouse (1860), . The district also includes the ruins of the Canby / Davis Blacksmith Shop (c. 1790).

It was added to the National Register of Historic Places in 1994.

Gallery

References

Historic districts in Bucks County, Pennsylvania
Federal architecture in Pennsylvania
Gothic Revival architecture in Pennsylvania
Historic districts on the National Register of Historic Places in Pennsylvania
National Register of Historic Places in Bucks County, Pennsylvania